JT LeRoy is a 2018 biographical drama film directed by Justin Kelly based on the memoir Girl Boy Girl: How I Became JT Leroy by Savannah Knoop. It stars Kristen Stewart, Laura Dern, Kelvin Harrison Jr., Diane Kruger, James Jagger, Dave Brown, Jim Sturgess and Courtney Love.

It had its world premiere as the closing night film of the 2018 Toronto International Film Festival. It was released April 26, 2019, by Universal Pictures.

Premise
Savannah Knoop spends six years masquerading as writer Laura Albert's literary persona JT LeRoy, the author credited for the novels Sarah and The Heart Is Deceitful Above All Things.

Cast
 Laura Dern as Laura Albert
 Kristen Stewart as Savannah Knoop
 Diane Kruger as Eva
 Jim Sturgess as Geoffrey Knoop
 Kelvin Harrison Jr. as Sean
 Courtney Love as Sasha
 James Jagger as Ben
 Dave Brown as Bruce

Production
On February 9, 2016, it was reported that Kristen Stewart, James Franco, and Helena Bonham Carter were circling the film JT LeRoy. Justin Kelly would direct the film based on Savannah Knoop's memoir Girl Boy Girl: How I Became JT Leroy. On March 22, 2017, it was reported that Laura Dern was in talks to join the film. Dern would play Laura Albert alongside Stewart as Knoop. On May 16, 2017, Diane Kruger joined the cast. On May 23, 2017, Jim Sturgess joined the cast. Before the film was fully financed, a skeleton crew attended the 2017 Cannes Film Festival to obtain some necessary footage. As of August 1, 2017, the film had begun principal photography in Winnipeg, Manitoba, Canada. Kelvin Harrison Jr., Courtney Love, and James Jagger also joined the cast. As of August 18, 2017, JT LeRoy had wrapped filming.

Release
It had its world premiere at the Toronto International Film Festival on September 15, 2018. Shortly after, Universal Pictures acquired distribution rights to the film. It was released on April 26, 2019.

Critical response
The website's critical consensus reads, "While it may leave some viewers wishing for a more in-depth exploration of its story and themes, J.T. Leroy offers a diverting dramatization of incredible real-life events." On Metacritic, the film has a weighted average score of 55 out of 100, based on 23 critics, indicating "mixed or average reviews".

References

External links

2018 films
Films about writers
Drama films based on actual events
Films set in Paris
Films set in Cannes
Films set in Tennessee
Films shot in Winnipeg
Films about hoaxes
American LGBT-related films
2018 LGBT-related films
Biographical films about LGBT people
LGBT-related drama films
American drama films
Universal Pictures films
2010s English-language films
2010s American films